Yu Kimura may refer to:

, Japanese boxer
, Japanese footballer